Milton Mufungulwa Sipalo, also known as The Lusaka Strangler, was a Zambian serial killer and rapist. The most prolific Zambian serial killer, Sipalo murdered 29 women and girls between January and September 1980. On 16 September 1980, one of his two surviving victims, accompanied by police, went back to the bus station she was attacked at. She quickly recognized Sipalo as her attacker, and he was arrested. Three days later, Sipalo escaped the clutches of the police officers escorting him and ran to the roof of the police station he was being held at. He then jumped off the building, killing himself.

Murders 
Sipalo is credited with being the most active serial killer, murdering the most victims out of any serial killer within the shortest amount of time. On average, Sipalo murdered one victim every week.

His modus operandi consisted of luring victims from public areas, typically bus terminals and railway stations, and led them to secluded locations where he would rape and strangle them. He then left the victims in open spaces where they were likely to be discovered. Many of Sipalo's victims had strange mucus or foam oozing from their noses, indicating he could have used chemicals during his attacks. Sipalo sometimes surrounded his victims' bodies with coins or bottles, presumably to taunt the police.

All of the victims were women and girls who were Lozi or spoke Lozi. Many of the victims were travelers from other towns or cities. They were often identified by national registration cards left on their bodies.

List of murders

Investigation 
By the end of January 1980, investigators realized the murders were connected, although they were unsure if they were the work of a lone perpetrator or a gang. They quickly interrogated all known sex offenders and murderers in the area, but found no leads. After more murders occurred, the public became more concerned, and the press, as well as politicians, put pressure on the police to capture the perpetrator. In response, they launched "Operation Rosemary." They advised women through newspaper advertisements and posters to be vigilant of strangers offering to escort them. They also implemented a dusk-to-dawn curfew, limiting the movement of people in Lusaka. Additionally, a reward of K 10,000 was offered to anyone with information leading to the arrest of a suspect.

Since the murders continued, police set up patrols around Lusaka, mostly in areas that Sipalo was known to pick up victims from. They also planted undercover, Lozi-speaking female detectives at bus terminals, although Sipalo never approached them. They also set up a Speical Investigation Team (SIT) made up of seasoned detectives around the country.

Surviving victims

First surviving victim 
On the evening 16 July, a young woman travelling to see her parents in Makeni arrived at the Kamwala bus terminus. She was soon approached by two soldiers, one wearing a combat uniform and the other in a green uniform. Later, the second soldier left, but the one wearing the combat uniform offered to escort the woman to Makeni. Despite her declining the offer, the man picked up her basket containing her belongings, forcing her to follow him. After a while, the two reached a small path, and the man introduced himself as Lieutenant Nyambe. He proceeded to ask her if she could identify him in civilian clothes, to which she replied that she could. Upon hearing this, the soldier pushed her to the ground and started choking her. She managed to kick her attacker off of her, but he then hit her with a spanner. He then told her, "you are the only girl whom I have failed to kill; I have killed the rest so you are the one who will cause me to be arrested." The attacker hit the woman again and fled the scene.

Three nearby security guards heard the woman's screams and rushed towards her while blowing their whistles. When they reached her, she was still screaming. They took her to a hotel, and she was later transferred to a police station for questioning before receiving a check-up at a local hospital. The woman, and a detective who had seen them together earlier, where able to provide a description of the attacker; a short, brown man dressed in a military uniform who could speak English and Nyanja with a Lozi accent. From this, investigators determined that the perpetrator was either a soldier or man impersonating a soldier.

Second surviving victim 
On 7 September, a woman left her home in Chingola and traveled to Lusaka via bus. Along the journey, she became acquainted with a woman traveling to Petauke. After their bus arrived in Lusaka, they decided to spend the night at the bus terminal, as there were no buses scheduled for either women's destination until the next morning. A short time later, the women were greeted by two soldiers, who asked the women to show them their national registration cards, to which they obliged. The soldiers attempted to convince the women to spend the night with them at a guest house, but the women declined. However, one of the soldiers carried the Petauke woman's bags with him, so the woman followed him. That woman has never been identified, and it is unknown whether she is alive or another victim.

Approximately one hour later, the other soldier persuaded the other woman by telling her that her acquaintance was sleeping in the guest house. The woman reluctantly agreed and followed him. After 30 minutes of walking, they arrived at a narrow path, and the soldier strangled the woman as she tended to her baby. She woke up hours later, her child crying next to her. Her national registration card had been taken out of her suitcase and placed on her head. The woman's wristwatch and wedding ring had also been stolen. She eventually got help after walking to a nearby house.

Arrest and Death 
After the attack of the second surviving victim, police were commanded to confront any soldier loitering at bus and railway stations. On 16 September, the second survivor, accompanied by a detective, went back to the bus station she was lured from to see if her attacker was there. She was soon greeted by Sipalo, who said, "I happen to have seen you somewhere!" The woman said that she never met him before and that she had recently arrived from Chingola. Sipalo then asked her to accompany him to a guest house, where he would book a room for her. She then saw Sipalo wearing her wristwatch that had been stolen from her during her attack. The woman subsequently alerted nearby police officers, who arrested Sipalo.

One day later, police searched his home and found items belonging to several of his victims. When confronted about the discovery, Sipalo falsely claimed the items were from a woman he fell in love with. However, he said that he no longer loved the woman after finding out that she had an operation on her abdomen. The supposed woman took her child to the hospital, but left behind her luggage.

Three witnesses, including the two survivors, identified Sipalo as the strangler. When told this by police, he said, "if they can pick me from the line of others, then I am the one who tried to kill them." That afternoon, Sipalo led officers to locations where he had murdered his victims. He also stated that he had an accomplice, a Lance Corporal. However, the Corporal denied the accusations, and police found no evidence linking him to the murders, so he was released.

On 18 September 1980, while being transferred to an interrogation in the Lusaka Central Police Station, Sipalo escaped the hands of the officers escorting and fled to the roof of the building, still in his handcuffs. Despite pleas from the police and fire brigade, Sipalo jumped off the roof in front of a crowd of people, killing himself.

See also 

 List of serial killers by country
 List of serial killers by number of victims

References 

Zambian serial killers
1980 suicides
Male serial killers
Suicides by jumping
20th-century Zambian people
Place of birth unknown
Date of birth unknown
20th-century criminals